The 2013–14 Hartford Hawks women's basketball team represented the University of Hartford in the America East Conference.  The Hawks were led by 15th year Women's Basketball Hall of Fame head coach Jennifer Rizzotti and will once again play their home games in the Chase Arena at Reich Family Pavilion.

Roster

Schedule

|-
!colspan=9 style=| Non-conference regular season

|-
!colspan=9 style="background:#; color:#FFFFFF;"| America East regular season

|-
!colspan=9 style="background:#; color:#FFFFFF;"| America East Women's Tournament

References

Hartford
Hartford Hawks women's basketball seasons
Hartford Hawks
Hartford Hawks